Mike Mulligan and His Steam Shovel is a children's book by Virginia Lee Burton. First published in 1939, in the wake of the Great Depression, it features Mike Mulligan, a steam shovel operator, and his steam shovel Mary Anne. It is considered a classic favorite of children's literature: based on a 2007 online poll, the National Education Association listed the book as one of its "Teachers' Top 100 Books for Children."

An animated short film of the same name, directed by Michael Sporn, narrated by stand-up comedian Robert Klein, was adapted from the book and first aired by HBO in 1990; it has been regularly shown as an "HBO Storybook Musical" and has been released on DVD.

Plot
After many years working together, Mike and his coal-powered steam shovel Mary Anne (whose name is a reference to the Marion Power Shovel Company) face competition from more modern gasoline, electric, and diesel shovels. Searching for work, they find a small town about to build a new town hall. Mike offers that if he and Mary Anne can't do the job in a single day, the town won't have to pay them. The town's selectmenwho believe the work would take a hundred men a weekhire Mike and Mary Anne, expecting to get their new cellar at no cost. Privately, even Mike has some doubts.

At sunup the next day Mike and Mary Anne begin work. When sundown comes they have just finished the job, but realize they have neglected to leave a ramp by which Mary Anne can get out of the cellar. A child suggests that Mary Anne be converted to a boiler for the new building's heating system, and that Mike become its janitor. Mike and Mary Anne settle contentedly into their new jobs.

Background
According to a 2006 article in The Boston Globe, the author set the book in West Newbury, Massachusetts after she attended town meeting in 1938 and sketched town hall and the townspeople. She was inspired to convert the steam shovel to a furnace by the son of friends, as they all discussed the book over dinner:

(Note: The first edition of the book spelled Dick Berkenbush's name incorrectly in a footnote crediting him with this idea.)

Cultural references
This popular book was occasionally read by host Captain Kangaroo (Bob Keeshan) on his children's television show of the same name.
 In Ramona the Pest by Beverly Cleary, the title character starts kindergarten with an inexperienced teacher, Miss Binney, who reads Mike Mulligan and his Steam Shovel to the class. Ramona (glad to finally be in school where she can finally get such burning questions answered), then stumps the teacher with the question of how Mike Mulligan went to the bathroom while digging the hole.

Adaptation
In 1990, HBO first aired an animated short film adapted from Mike Mulligan and His Steam Shovel, directed by Michael Sporn, adapted and narrated by stand-up comedian Robert Klein, and produced by Michael Sporn Animation and Italtoons Corporation. As of 2012 this short film is regularly shown as an "HBO Storybook Musical." It was released on video by Golden Video (a partner company of Golden Books). The video was also released on DVD by Scholastic Books under HBO license, along with 27 other films adapted from classic children's books.
In 2006, Weston Woods Studios adapted the book to an animated film narrated by David De Vries, and directed by Leigh Corra.

References

External links

1939 children's books
American picture books
American animated short films
Houghton Mifflin books